The Ehrhardt 7.5 cm Model 1904 mountain guns were originally issued to the Schutztruppe in German South-West Africa. The gun was also issued to the Portuguese colonial forces in Angola.

Survivors
12 guns are known to have been produced and all 12 still survive in various museums and open air displays around the world.
 Nr.1 At the South African National Museum of Military History, Johannesburg
 Nr.2 Outside the Bloemfontein Law Courts
 Nr.3 At the Koblenz Museum of Military Technology, Germany
 Nr.4 Outside the Union Buildings, Pretoria
 Nr.5 At the Transvaal Scottish Regiment, Johannesburg
 Nr.6 Outside the Union Buildings, Pretoria
 Nr.7 At the Imperial War Museum, Duxford
 Nr.8 Bethal Museum
 Nr.9 Outside the Bloemfontein Law Courts
 Nr.10 Outside the Union Buildings, Pretoria
 Nr.11 At Warrior's Gate MOTH Shellhole, Durban
 Nr.12 In the Ermelo War Memorial

See also

Ehrhardt 7.5 cm Model 1901

References

External links
The 7.5cm Schutztruppe Mountain Gun

75 mm artillery
Field artillery of Germany
World War I artillery of Germany
World War I mountain artillery
Rheinmetall